The Kea Channel, is a passage of water in the Aegean Sea. lying between the islands of Kea and Makronisos, just off Cape Sounion, Attica on the mainland of Greece. 

Bodies of water of Greece
Landforms of Kea-Kythnos
Landforms of the South Aegean
Channels of Europe